The Hill School is a private, K-8 co-educational day school in Middleburg, Virginia, United States that was established in 1926.

History
Hill School opened in 1926 with five students in an upstairs room in what was then the Middleburg Bank, at 1 East Washington Street. In 1928, the school moved to a half acre of land at its current location.

Over the next sixty-three years (1928-1991) the school's enrollment and campus steadily grew. In 1991, the enrollment was 178 and the 4.5 acre campus consisted of five buildings, one playing field, and a faculty house.

In 1991 and 1992, Mr. Stephen C. Clark Jr. and his daughter, Hill alumna Jane Forbes Clark, gave the school 133 acres, three houses, and a barn.

Today, Hill School serves students in Junior Kindergarten through 8th grade.

Campus
The campus was expanded by 133 acres in 1991 and 1992 through the gifts of land from Stephen C. Clark Jr. and his daughter, Hill alumna Jane Forbes Clark.  As a result, the Board of Trustees and school leadership were able to develop a comprehensive master plan which was completed between 1993 and 2003.

Most of the daily school routine occurs in the northeast quadrant of the campus.  The academic and co-curricular facilities are separated by small courtyards and are connected by a central brick walkway. Traffic circles and parking areas are located on the perimeter so there is no car parking in the central campus.

The athletic fields, the amphitheater, the walking and running trails, the arboretum, the science center, ponds and wetlands are located to the south and west of the buildings and encompass most of the land.  Five of the fifteen school-owned faculty houses are on or contiguous to the campus.

Place-Based Education Program
In addition to the JK-8 science curriculum emphasizing hands-on learning, Hill School incorporates place-based outdoor field studies – the Dornin Science Center units. This unique program gives children the opportunity to use scientific field methodology to monitor, interact with, and connect to their environment, which fosters responsible stewardship. Field studies include forest surveys, water quality monitoring using chemical tests and invertebrate surveys, soil testing and soil amendment, growing food, bluebird box construction and observation, colonial gardening, and many other outdoor activities. Most of these programs take place on our beautiful 137 acre campus, which includes a variety of habitats and open spaces.

Co-Curricular Program
Hill School refers to Art, Music, Drama, and Athletics as co-curricular program to emphasize that they are part of  a parcel to every student's Hill School experience. Hill believes that every child should have meaningful participation and engagement with these co-cirricular programs.

Educational institutions established in 1926
Schools in Loudoun County, Virginia
Private middle schools in Virginia
Private elementary schools in Virginia
1926 establishments in Virginia
Private K–8 schools in the United States